Faro Airport  is located  south of Faro, Yukon, Canada, and is operated by the Yukon government.

References

External links
Yukon Government Airports/Aerodromes

Registered aerodromes in Yukon